= Rasla Khedi =

- village
- Location within Madhya Pradesh Location within India
- Coordinates: 23.3975115°N 77.4214278°E
- Country: India
- State: Madhya Pradesh
- District: Bhopal
- Tehsil: Huzur
- Elevation: 475 m (1,558 ft)

Population (2011)
  - Total: 457
- Time zone: UTC+5:30 (IST)
- ISO 3166 code: MP-IN
- 2011 census code: 482405

Rasla Khedi is a village in the Bhopal district of Madhya Pradesh, India. It is located in the Huzur tehsil and the Phanda block.

== Demographics ==
According to the 2011 census of India, Rasla Khedi has 112 households. The effective literacy rate (i.e. the literacy rate of population excluding children aged 6 and below) is 77.4%.

Demographics (2011 Census)
	Total	Male	Female
Population	457	242	215
Children aged below 6 years	72	40	32
Scheduled caste	94	46	48
Scheduled tribe	0	0	0
Literates	298	174	124
Workers (all)	173	112	61
Main workers (total)	133	97	36
Main workers: Cultivators	36	29	7
Main workers: Agricultural labourers	46	33	13
Main workers: Household industry workers	8	7	1
Main workers: Other	43	28	15
Marginal workers (total)	40	15	25
Marginal workers: Cultivators	10	1	9
Marginal workers: Agricultural labourers	11	6	5
Marginal workers: Household industry workers	9	2	7
Marginal workers: Others	10	6	4
Non-workers	284	130	154
